Irbis Ishbara Yabgu Qaghan (full title: Yǐpíshābōluóyèhùkĕhàn 乙毗沙钵罗叶护可汗, personal name: Ashina Baobu 阿史那薄布) - was a Qaghan of Nushibi faction in Western Turkic Khaganate.

Reign 
He was a son of Genna Shad (伽那设), thus a nephew of El Kulug Shad. However, according to some sources he was a son of Ashina Tong. He was acknowledged as khagan by Taizong. Khagan sent governors to the Tarim Basin, Tashkent, Samarkand and Bactria to assert rule. However, he was soon killed by men following orders of Yukuk Shad in 641.

References 

641 deaths
7th-century Turkic people
Ashina house of the Turkic Empire
Göktürk khagans